Terre-de-Bancalié (Languedocien: Tèrra de Bancaliá) is a commune in the Tarn department in southern France. It was established on 1 January 2019 by merger of the former communes of Roumégoux (the seat), Ronel, Saint-Antonin-de-Lacalm, Saint-Lieux-Lafenasse, Terre-Clapier and Le Travet.

See also
Communes of the Tarn department

References

Communes of Tarn (department)